Rico Strieder (born 6 July 1992) is a German professional footballer who plays as a midfielder for SV Heimstetten

Club career 
Strieder is a youth product of the Bayern Munich academy. On 2 May 2015, he made his debut for first-team in away match against Bayer Leverkusen.

On 10 July 2015, Strieder transferred to Utrecht.

Personal life
Strieder was born in Dachau, Bavaria.

Career statistics

References

External links 
 
 

1992 births
Living people
German footballers
Association football midfielders
FC Bayern Munich II players
FC Bayern Munich footballers
FC Utrecht players
PEC Zwolle players
SV Heimstetten players
Bundesliga players
Eredivisie players
Eerste Divisie players
Regionalliga players
German expatriate footballers
Expatriate footballers in the Netherlands
German expatriate sportspeople in the Netherlands